Kristina Kock (born 7 August 1995) is an Austrian female deaf alpine skier. She is also the elder sister of fellow Austrian alpine skier, Melissa Kock.  

Kristina participated at the 2015 Winter Deaflympics and competed in the women's giant slalom, slalom, downhill, Super-G and super combined events. She claimed her only Deaflympic medal which was a bronze medal in the women's slalom event at the 2015 Winter Deaflympics as the silver medal in the relevant criteria was claimed by her sister, Melissa Kock while the gold medal was clinched by Tereza Kmochová.

References 

1995 births
Living people
Austrian female alpine skiers
Deaf skiers
Austrian deaf people
Medalists at the 2015 Winter Deaflympics
Alpine skiers at the 2015 Winter Deaflympics
Deaflympic bronze medalists for Austria
20th-century Austrian women
21st-century Austrian women